Charles Tony Bratley (born 30 April 1939) is an English retired professional footballer who played as a full-back.

References

1939 births
People from Spalding, Lincolnshire
English footballers
Association football fullbacks
Grimsby Town F.C. players
Gainsborough Trinity F.C. players
English Football League players
Living people